Udea brevipalpis is a moth in the family Crambidae. It was described by Eugene G. Munroe in 1966. It is found in North America, where it has been recorded from California, Colorado and Utah.

The wingspan is about 21 mm. Adults have been recorded on wing from July to August.

References

Moths described in 1966
brevipalpis